The Stenopodidea or boxer shrimps are a small group of decapod crustaceans. Often confused with Caridea shrimp or Dendrobranchiata prawns, they are neither, belonging to their own group.

Anatomy
They can be differentiated from the Dendrobranchiata prawns by their lack of branching gills, and by the fact that they brood their eggs instead of directly releasing them into the water.  They differ from the Caridea shrimp by their greatly enlarged third pair of legs.

Taxonomy
Stenopodidea belongs to the order Decapoda, and is most closely related to the Caridea and Procarididea infraorders of shrimp.  The cladogram below shows Stenopodidea's relationships to other relatives within Decapoda, from analysis by Wolfe et al., 2019.

There are 71 extant species currently recognized within Stenopodidea, divided into 12 genera. Three fossil species are also recognized, each belonging to a separate genus. The earliest fossil assigned to the Stenopodidea is Devonostenopus pennsylvaniensis from the Devonian. Until D. pennsylvaniensis was discovered, the oldest known member of the group was Jilinicaris chinensis from the Late Cretaceous.

The cladogram below shows Stenopodidea's internal relationships:

Stenopodidea comprises the following families and genera:

Macromaxillocarididae Alvarez, Iliffe & Villalobos, 2006
Macromaxillocaris Alvarez, Iliffe & Villalobos, 2006
Spongicolidae Schram, 1986
Engystenopus Alcock & Anderson, 1894
Globospongicola Komai & Saito, 2006
Jilinicaris † Schram, Shen, Vonk & Taylor, 2000
Microprosthema Stimpson, 1860
Paraspongicola De Saint Laurent & Cléva, 1981
Spongicola De Haan, 1844
Spongicoloides Hansen, 1908
Spongiocaris Bruce & Baba, 1973
Stenopodidae Claus, 1872
Devonostenopus † Jones et al., 2014
Juxtastenopus Goy, 2010
Odontozona Holthuis, 1946
Phoenice † Garassino, 2001
Richardina A. Milne-Edwards, 1881
Stenopus Latreille, 1819

References

 
Arthropod infraorders
Extant Late Devonian first appearances